New Milton is an unincorporated community in central Doddridge County, West Virginia, United States. The community is located along Meathouse Fork, southeast of the town of West Union, the county seat of Doddridge County. It had a post office with the ZIP code 26411, but was closed several years ago.

References

Citations

Further reading
Randolph, Roy F. (1926), History of New Milton Community, Doddridge County, West Virginia. Morgantown, West Virginia, Agricultural Extension Division.

Unincorporated communities in Doddridge County, West Virginia
Unincorporated communities in West Virginia